Nuneaton and Bedworth Borough Council elections are held every other year, with half the council being elected each time. Nuneaton and Bedworth Borough Council is the local authority for the non-metropolitan district of Nuneaton and Bedworth in Warwickshire, England. Since the last boundary changes in 2002, 34 councillors have been elected from 17 wards. Prior to 2002 elections were held three years out of every four, with a third of the council elected each time.

Political control
The town of Nuneaton had been a municipal borough from 1907 to 1974 with a borough council. The first elections to the enlarged Nuneaton Borough created under the Local Government Act 1972 were held in 1973, initially operating as a shadow authority until the new arrangements came into effect on 1 April 1974. The name of the borough was changed to Nuneaton and Bedworth on 1 October 1980. Political control of the council since 1974 has been held by the following parties:

Leadership
The leaders of the council since 1974 have been:

Council elections
1973 Nuneaton Borough Council election
1976 Nuneaton Borough Council election
1979 Nuneaton Borough Council election (New ward boundaries)
1980 Nuneaton and Bedworth Borough Council election
1982 Nuneaton and Bedworth Borough Council election
1983 Nuneaton and Bedworth Borough Council election
1984 Nuneaton and Bedworth Borough Council election
1986 Nuneaton and Bedworth Borough Council election
1987 Nuneaton and Bedworth Borough Council election
1988 Nuneaton and Bedworth Borough Council election
1990 Nuneaton and Bedworth Borough Council election
1991 Nuneaton and Bedworth Borough Council election
1992 Nuneaton and Bedworth Borough Council election
1994 Nuneaton and Bedworth Borough Council election (Borough boundary changes took place but the number of seats remained the same)
1995 Nuneaton and Bedworth Borough Council election
1996 Nuneaton and Bedworth Borough Council election
1998 Nuneaton and Bedworth Borough Council election
1999 Nuneaton and Bedworth Borough Council election
2000 Nuneaton and Bedworth Borough Council election
2002 Nuneaton and Bedworth Borough Council election (New ward boundaries reduced the number of seats by 11)
2004 Nuneaton and Bedworth Borough Council election
2006 Nuneaton and Bedworth Borough Council election
2008 Nuneaton and Bedworth Borough Council election
2010 Nuneaton and Bedworth Borough Council election
2012 Nuneaton and Bedworth Borough Council election
2014 Nuneaton and Bedworth Borough Council election
2016 Nuneaton and Bedworth Borough Council election
2018 Nuneaton and Bedworth Borough Council election
2021 Nuneaton and Bedworth Borough Council election
2022 Nuneaton and Bedworth Borough Council election
2024 Nuneaton and Bedworth Borough Council election

By-election results

1997-2001

2005-2009

2009-2017

2018-present

References

By-election results

External links
Nuneaton and Bedworth Borough Council

 
Council elections in Warwickshire
Nuneaton and Bedworth
District council elections in England